The Council of Europe was founded on 5 May 1949 by ten western and northern European states, with Greece joining three months later, and Iceland, Turkey and West Germany joining the next year. It now has 46 member states, with Montenegro being the latest to join.

Article 4 of the Council of Europe Statute specifies that membership is open to any European country, provided they meet specific democratic and human rights standards. Nearly all countries with territory in Europe have acceded to the Council of Europe, with the exceptions of Belarus, Kazakhstan, Russia, and Vatican City, as well as states with limited recognition.



List

Former members

Applicants 
Special Guest status with the Parliamentary Assembly was established in 1989, as a provisional status in the accession process for parliaments of European non-member states, which applied for membership in the Council of Europe. The aim of the special guest status is to foster closer relations with the national parliaments of the European non-member states, by enabling the parliament concerned to be represented in, and work with, the Assembly, especially in determining the accession conditions.

Belarus 
Belarus applied for full membership on 12 March 1993, and its parliament held special guest status with the Parliamentary Assembly from September 1992 to January 1997. The special guest status was however suspended as a consequence of the November 1996 constitutional referendum upholding the death penalty, and parliament by-elections which the CoE found to be undemocratic, as well as enforced limits on democratic freedoms such as freedom of expression (cf. Belarusian media) under the administration of President Alexander Lukashenko. A second change of the Belarus constitution in October 2004, moreover "does not respect minimum democratic standards and violates the principles of separation of powers and the rule of law". In June 2009, PACE decided that the suspension of the Belarusian parliament's special guest status in the Assembly would only be lifted conditional of the government imposing a moratorium on the death penalty. As of May 2013, this condition had not been met.

Kazakhstan 
Kazakhstan applied for the Special Guest status with the Parliamentary Assembly in 1999. The Assembly found that Kazakhstan could apply for full membership, because 4% of its territory, west of the Ural river, is located in Europe, but granting Special Guest status would require improvements in the fields of democracy and human rights. Kazakhstan signed a co-operation agreement with the Assembly in April 2004.

In November 2006, the Kazakhstan Parliament officially asked to be granted observer status with the Assembly, which however was never granted due to requiring a pre compliance with all CoE core values and principles. The country acceded to the Council of Europe's European Cultural Convention on 24 February 2010. On 15 to 16 March 2010, the President of the Council of Europe's Parliamentary Assembly (PACE) made an official visit to Kazakhstan, resulting in the conclusion that the Council of Europe and Kazakhstan strengthen their relations. This milestone emboldens Kazakhstan's "Path to Europe" programme, as outlined by Kazakh president Nursultan Nazarbayev in Astana in 2008.

In December 2013, a Joint Declaration on enhancing cooperation between Kazakhstan and the Council of Europe in 2014–15, was signed with the purpose of paving the way for Kazakhstan's accession to the Council of Europe's multiple conventions in the field of criminal justice.

Kosovo 
The Assembly of Kosovo was invited to take part in the work of the Parliamentary Assembly of the Council of Europe and its committees as an observer in 2016.

Hashim Thaçi, Kosovo's Minister of Foreign Affairs, stated in December 2014 that an application for membership of the Council of Europe was planned to be filed within the first quarter of 2015. On May 12, 2022, Foreign Minister Donika Gervalla-Schwarz submitted the application for membership at a meeting with the Council’s leadership in Strasbourg. Kosovo is already de facto under the jurisdiction of the European Court of Human Rights.

Observers

Vatican City 
Despite being in Europe, Vatican City has never applied for Council of Europe membership, choosing to become an observer instead. However, there have been calls for it to apply to become a contracting party to the European Convention on Human Rights.

Other countries 
Observer status was designed for non-European democracies willing to contribute to democratic transitions in Europe.

Canada, Japan, Mexico, the U.S. and the Holy See have observer status with the Council of Europe and can participate in the Committee of Ministers and all intergovernmental committees. They may contribute financially to the activities of the Council of Europe on a voluntary basis.

The parliaments of Canada, Israel and Mexico have observer status with the Parliamentary Assembly and their delegations can participate in Assembly sessions and committee meetings. Representatives of the Palestinian Legislative Council may participate in Assembly debates concerning the Middle East as well as Turkish-Cypriot representatives from Northern Cyprus concerning this island.

There has been criticism concerning the observer status of Japan and the United States because both countries apply the death penalty. The Parliamentary Assembly of the Council of Europe has been lobbying for the United States and Japan to abolish the death penalty or lose their observer status. The Council also voted to restore Special Guest status to Belarus, on condition that Belarus declares a moratorium on the death penalty.

Partners 
In May 2009, the Parliamentary Assembly established a new status for institutional co-operation with parliaments of non-member states in neighboring regions wishing to be supported by the Parliamentary Assembly in their democratic transitions and to participate in the political debate on common challenges.

The new status is called "Partner for democracy" and interested states could obtain it if they commit to embrace the values of the Council of Europe such as pluralist democracy, the rule of law and respect for human rights and fundamental freedoms; to encourage a moratorium on executions and abolish the death penalty; to organize free and fair elections; to become party to the relevant CoE conventions; to utilize the expertize of the Assembly and the Venice Commission in its institutional and legislative work.

CoE has adopted the policy of dialogue with the neighboring regions of the southern Mediterranean, the Middle East and Central Asia – based on respect for universal human rights. Following this policy the Assembly has already established working contacts with parliaments of neighbouring countries other than those of the CoE Observers: Algeria, Kazakhstan, Morocco, Tunisia and the Palestinian Legislative Council. Several of these parliaments have expressed interest in upgrading the status of the existing co-operation, and in establishing a relationship on a permanent basis.

Since 1994, parliaments of the countries bordering the Council of Europe member states have the possibility of concluding special co-operation agreements with the Assembly, but it has not generated much interest among the parliaments concerned, which suggests that it does not offer sufficient clarity and visibility. So far only the Kazakhstan Parliament had taken advantage of it since 2004.

In November 2006, the Kazakhstan Parliament officially asked to be granted observer status with the Assembly. Such formal or informal requests are made by a number of parliaments that are already co-operating with it but think that the institutionalized recognition of that co-operation could make it more visible, more coherent and more effective. However the observer status is considered inappropriate in these cases, as it requires that the state receiving it already complies with the CoE core values and principles, which is not the case for the states currently requesting it, who are in the early stages of democratic transition.

The newly established "Partner for democracy" status is similar to the co-operation initiatives of other intergovernmental organizations of mostly European states such as the European Neighbourhood Policy of the EU, the partners for co-operation of OSCE, the cooperation with non-member states of NATO.

The national parliaments eligible to request a "Partner for democracy" status are from the following countries:
southern Mediterranean and Middle East participants in the Union for the Mediterranean: Mauritania, Morocco, Algeria, Tunisia, Egypt, Israel, Jordan, Syria, Lebanon, Palestine and maybe Libya
Central Asian participants in the OSCE: Kazakhstan, Kyrgyzstan, Tajikistan, Turkmenistan and Uzbekistan
other states if the Bureau of the Assembly so decides

As of 2015 the following parliaments have been accorded "Partner for democracy" status:
Morocco – June 2011
Palestinian National Council – 4 October 2011
Kyrgyzstan – 8 April 2014

References

 
Council of Europe